Marlon Lavalle Kerner (born March 18, 1973) is a former American football cornerback in the National Football League. He was drafted by the Buffalo Bills in the third round of the 1995 NFL Draft. He played college football at Ohio State.

1973 births
Living people
American football cornerbacks
Ohio State Buckeyes football players
Buffalo Bills players